Le Riopelle de l'Isle is a triple-cream cheese from Quebec that has an oily and sometimes flowing texture known to melt in the mouth. It possesses a smooth buttery taste, with hints of hazelnuts and mushrooms. 

It is named after Jean-Paul Riopelle, a renowned Québécois artist and painter, and for each 1.4 kg piece, $1 goes to a foundation that helps the children of Isle-aux-Grues, Quebec, Canada, the island where this cheese is manufactured, to get a higher education. 

The label on Le Riopelle de l'Isle is a reproduction of one of Riopelle's paintings.

More information
Type: [unpasteurized cows milk]], soft paste, flowery crust
Manufacturer: Fromagerie de l'Île-aux-Grues
Size: 1.4 kg
Fat content: 35%
Humidity content: 50%

See also
 List of cheeses

External links 
More information from l'Isle-aux-Grues 

Cuisine of Quebec
Canadian cheeses
Cow's-milk cheeses